The Danao languages are a group of Austronesian languages spoken in the Philippines. They are Maguindanaon and Maranao, each with approximately a million speakers; and Iranun with approximately 250,000 speakers.

Numerals

References

Allison, E.J. 1979. "Proto-Danaw: A Comparative Study of Maranaw, Magindanaw and Iranun". In Gallman, A., Allison, E., Harmon, C. and Witucki, J. editors, Papers in Philippine Linguistics No. 10. A-55:53-112. Pacific Linguistics, The Australian National University. 

 
Greater Central Philippine languages
Languages of Maguindanao del Norte
Languages of Maguindanao del Sur
Languages of Lanao del Sur